The Europe Zone was one of the three regional zones of the 1959 Davis Cup.

The seeding system for the Europe Zone was modified so that only the previous year's semifinalists were guaranteed first round byes, allowing more countries to compete. 27 teams entered the Europe Zone, with the winner going on to compete in the Inter-Zonal Zone against the winners of the America Zone and Eastern Zone.

Italy defeated Spain in the final and progressed to the Inter-Zonal Zone.

Draw

First round

Belgium vs. Netherlands

Lebanon vs. Colombia

Norway vs. South Africa

Egypt vs. Romania

Ireland vs. New Zealand

Yugoslavia vs. Denmark

West Germany vs. Brazil

Finland vs. Spain

Israel vs. Switzerland

Sweden vs. Hungary

Austria vs. Chile

Second round

Belgium vs. Italy

South Africa vs. Colombia

Romania vs. New Zealand

Denmark vs. France

Poland vs. Brazil

Spain vs. Switzerland

Sweden vs. Chile

Luxembourg vs. Great Britain

Quarterfinals

Italy vs. South Africa

France vs. Romania

Spain vs. Brazil

Great Britain vs. Chile

Semifinals

Italy vs. France

Spain vs. Great Britain

Final

Italy vs. Spain

References

External links
Davis Cup official website

Davis Cup Europe/Africa Zone
Europe Zone
Davis Cup